Mount Wasko is a double-peaked, saddle-shaped mountain (1,170 m) on the west side of Shackleton Glacier, 3 nautical miles (6 km) north of Mount Franke, in the Queen Maud Mountains. Discovered by the United States Antarctic Service (USAS) (1939–41), and surveyed by A.P. Crary (1957–58). Named by Crary for Lieutenant Commander Frank Wasko, U.S. Navy Reserve, of Squadron VX-6 at Little America V in 1957–58.

Mountains of the Ross Dependency
Dufek Coast